California's 12th State Assembly district is one of 80 California State Assembly districts. It is currently represented by Republican Heath Flora of Ripon.

District profile 
The district consists of part of the northern San Joaquin Valley, adjacent to the Gold Country. The district is centered on Modesto, one of the valley's major population centers.

San Joaquin County – 22.3%
 Escalon
 Lathrop
 Manteca
 Ripon

Stanislaus County – 60.1%
 Hughson
 Modesto – 61.6%
 Oakdale
 Riverbank
 Turlock
 Waterford

Election results from statewide races

List of Assembly Members 
Due to redistricting, the 12th district has been moved around different parts of the state. The current iteration resulted from the 2011 redistricting by the California Citizens Redistricting Commission.

Election results 1992 - present

2020

2018

2016

2014

2012

2010

2008

2006

2004

2002

2000

1998

1996

1994

1992

See also 
 California State Assembly
 California State Assembly districts
 Districts in California

References

External links 
 District map from the California Citizens Redistricting Commission

12
Government of San Joaquin County, California
Government of Stanislaus County, California
San Joaquin Valley
Modesto, California
Oakdale, California
Turlock, California